Monostiolum nocturnum is a species of sea snail, a marine gastropod mollusk in the family Pisaniidae.

Distribution
This marine species occurs in the Caribbean Sea off Tobago.

References

External links
 Watters, G. T. (2009). A revision of the western Atlantic Ocean genera Anna, Antillophos, Bailya, Caducifer, Monostiolum, and Parviphos, with description of a new genus, Dianthiphos, and notes on Engina and Hesperisternia Gastropoda: Buccinidae: Pisaniinae) and Cumia (Colubrariidae). The Nautilus. 123(4): 225–275

Pisaniidae
Gastropods described in 2009